The A18 is a motorway in north west Belgium stretching from the French border near Dunkerque to the A10 motorway between Ostend and Bruges.

References

Motorways in Belgium